Teens of Denial is the tenth studio album by American indie rock band Car Seat Headrest, released on May 20, 2016 via Matador Records. The album served as the band's second for the label and the first to consist of newly written material.

Background 
Writing for Teens of Denial began in 2013, shortly after the release of Car Seat Headrest's eighth album, Nervous Young Man. Due to the previous album's length and complexity, lead singer and songwriter Will Toledo decided to focus on writing music that was more straightforward and easier to perform live. Toledo would go on to describe Teens of Denial as a bildungsroman, adding that, "I wrote it during a period in my life where I was not feeling a lot of love. Its tone and content reflect that. I made it because that's what I do - records have always marked the various phases of my life, and I needed to get out of this one, so I needed to make a record." The album was heavily influenced by Toledo's time in college at The College of William and Mary in Williamsburg, Virginia, but also drew influence from the life of Frank Sinatra and Ernest Becker's 1974 book, The Denial of Death.

In an interview with Uproxx, Toledo noted that it took two years to finish writing the album, as he wanted the songs to flow together coherently. Outtakes from this period were released on the 2014 EP, How to Leave Town.

Release
In a November 2015 interview with Billboard, Toledo stated that the band's 2015 album Teens of Style would be followed by Teens of Denial, which he indicated would be their first to feature an outside producer and a "totally different" sound. On February 23, 2016, the lead single from Teens of Denial, "Vincent", was released, along with an accompanying music video. On March 24, Toledo announced a May 20 release date for the album and premiered the album's second single, "Drunk Drivers/Killer Whales".

Recall
On May 13, 2016, Matador Records recalled the entire initial compact disc and vinyl print runs of the album following the denial of permission to use lyrics from The Cars' "Just What I Needed" in the song "Just What I Needed/Not Just What I Needed". It was the first time in the label's history that they had recalled a record. The recalled copies were destroyed at the label's warehouse using a garbage truck compactor.

Car Seat Headrest and Matador Records had believed that they had secured the proper approval from The Cars' publisher to include the interpolation of "Just What I Needed" in "Just What I Needed/Not Just What I Needed" and had moved forward with pressing copies of Teens of Denial with the song. However, on May 10, 2016, Cars singer and songwriter Ric Ocasek denied permission to use elements of "Just What I Needed" after discovering that Toledo had changed a line from the original lyrics.

Toledo recorded a new version of the song, titled "Not What I Needed", which removed the elements from "Just What I Needed" and was inserted in the revised track list of the album, adding a reversed sample of "Something Soon" from Car Seat Headrest's previous album, Teens of Style, and a recording of an interview Toledo did with a German radio station. The digital release of Teens of Denial was unaffected by the recall and included the new song, while the physical release was delayed until July.

Critical reception

Teens of Denial holds a score of 86 out of 100 on the online review aggregate site Metacritic, indicating "universal acclaim". David Brusie of The A.V. Club wrote that the repeated "exercise in tension and release" throughout the record "is essential to Teens of Denials blistering greatness", concluding that "Toledo seems to be saying, buckle in; I'm taking you somewhere exciting. Trust him." Mark Deming of AllMusic found "real and powerful wit" in the album's songs and stated that Toledo "has created something like a novel after previously offering us short stories, and it's a piece of rough-hewn brilliance." In a "Best New Music" review for Pitchfork, Jeremy Gordon noted "even with the bigger budget and brighter environs, Toledo's underriding DIY sensibility comes through", adding that, "there’s an honest reckoning with what his wallowing has led to, and rapturous exhortation when logic alone cannot solve a problem" in regard to the album's themes and lyrics. NME critic Alex Flood called Teens of Denial "the work of a precocious talent."

Accolades

Track listing

Personnel
Car Seat Headrest
 Will Toledo – vocals, guitars, organ, piano, Mellotron
 Ethan Ives – bass, vocals, guitars, vibrato switch on organ
 Andrew Katz – drums, mixed percussion, Mellotron, vocals
 Seth Dalby – bass 

Additional musicians
 Jon Maus – trumpets and trombone 
 Nick Shadel – piano 
 Jim Dejoie – saxophone 

Production
 Steve Fisk – production
 Gordon S. Fisk – back cover photograph
 Mike Zimmerman – cover layout, design

Charts

References

2016 albums
Matador Records albums
Car Seat Headrest albums
Albums produced by Steve Fisk
Concept albums